Jeff Toms (born June 4, 1974) is a Canadian former professional ice hockey player. Toms was selected by the New Jersey Devils 210th overall in the 1992 NHL Entry Draft..

Playing career

Before ever playing for the New Jersey Devils, Toms was traded to the Tampa Bay Lightning, where he would spend a few seasons before he was claimed on waivers by the Washington Capitals. On December 5th, 1997 Toms scored the first game winning goal and first overtime goal in Capital One Arena (then MCI Center) history. Toms would also play for the New York Islanders, New York Rangers, Pittsburgh Penguins, and Florida Panthers.

In 2003, Toms moved to Europe, splitting the 2003-04 season with spells in the Russian Superleague for HC Severstal Cherepovets and in Nationalliga A in Switzerland with EHC Basel. Toms would go on to play the remainder of his career in Switzerland, playing two seasons with HC Ambri-Piotta, three with SCL Tigers and then finishing his playing career with Genève-Servette HC. He played for Team Canada in the Spengler Cup in 2004, 2005, and 2006.

Career statistics

Regular season and playoffs

References

External links

1974 births
Living people
Adirondack Red Wings players
Atlanta Knights players
Canadian ice hockey centres
EHC Basel players
Florida Panthers players
Genève-Servette HC players
Hartford Wolf Pack players
HC Ambrì-Piotta players
Ice hockey people from Saskatchewan
New York Islanders players
New York Rangers players
People from Swift Current
Pittsburgh Penguins players
Portland Pirates players
San Antonio Rampage players
Sault Ste. Marie Greyhounds players
SCL Tigers players
Severstal Cherepovets players
Springfield Falcons players
Tampa Bay Lightning players
Washington Capitals players
New Jersey Devils draft picks